Tonkinula aurofasciata is a species of beetles in the family Buprestidae, the only species in the genus Tonkinula.

References

Buprestidae genera